|}

The Rockingham Stakes is a Listed flat horse race in Great Britain open to horses aged two years only.
It is run at York over a distance of 6 furlongs (1,206 metres), and it is scheduled to take place each year in October.

Winners since 1988

See also
 Horse racing in Great Britain
 List of British flat horse races

References
Racing Post: 
,, 

Flat races in Great Britain
York Racecourse
Flat horse races for two-year-olds